In mathematics, a stella octangula number is a figurate number based on the stella octangula, of the form .

The sequence of stella octangula numbers is
0, 1, 14, 51, 124, 245, 426, 679, 1016, 1449, 1990, ... 

Only two of these numbers are square.

Ljunggren's equation
The elliptic curve describing the square stella octangula numbers,

may be placed in the equivalent Weierstrass form

by the change of variables , .

Louis J. Mordell conjectured that the proof could be simplified, and several later authors published simplifications.

Additional applications
The stella octangula numbers arise in a parametric family of instances to the crossed ladders problem in which the lengths and heights of the ladders and the height of their crossing point are all integers. In these instances, the ratio between the heights of the two ladders is a stella octangula number.

References

External links

Figurate numbers